Anwar Hussain or Hussein may refer to:

 Anwar Hussain (cricketer) (1920–2002), Pakistani cricketer
 Anwar Hussain (politician) (born 1947), member of the 14th Lok Sabha of India
 Anwar Hussain (actor) (1925–1988), Bollywood actor
 Anwar (singer) (Anwar Hussain, born 1949), playback singer
 Anwar Hussain (officer), general in the Bangladesh Army
 Anwar Hussein (photographer) (born 1938), Tanzanian photo journalist and author